Andricus quercusfoliatus, the leafy oak gall wasp, is a species of gall wasp in the family Cynipidae.

References

Further reading

 
 
 

Cynipidae
Insects described in 1881
Gall-inducing insects

Taxa named by William Harris Ashmead